Michael R. Williams is an American osteopathic physician and the current chancellor of the University of North Texas System. On November 29, 2021, Williams - the sixth president of the University of North Texas Health Science Center in Fort Worth, Texas - was appointed by the University of North Texas System Board of Regents as the fifth UNT System Chancellor, effective Jan. 1, 2022 succeeding Lesa Roe.

Dr. Williams was named to the President of the University of North Texas Health Science Center at Fort Worth (HSC) in 2013 by the University of North Texas System Board of Regents to succeed Scott Ransom. Dr. Williams practiced anesthesiology and critical care medicine in Texas for more than 20 years and is an experienced business executive and entrepreneur. Dr. Williams also served as CEO of Hill Country Memorial Hospital in Fredericksburg, Texas. Hill Country Memorial received a Best Practices award from the judges of the Malcolm Baldrige National Quality Award in 2013. Dr. Williams also served on the UNT System Board of Regents.

Williams is a member of U.S. News & World Report's national Hospital of Tomorrow Advisory Council, which consists of top U.S. healthcare leaders.

Education
Dr. Williams earned his bachelor's degree in biology from Texas Wesleyan University in 1977 and his Doctor of Osteopathic Medicine (D.O.) degree from the University of North Texas Health Science Center in 1981. He then completed his residency in general surgery at Methodist Dallas Medical Center and anesthesiology/critical care at Parkland Memorial Hospital where he served as chief resident.

Dr. Williams holds an M.B.A. degree from Duke University and a master's degree in Health Care Management from Harvard University. He also has an M.D. degree from Ross University School of Medicine.

References

American osteopathic physicians
Living people
Harvard School of Public Health alumni
Duke University alumni
American health care chief executives
Year of birth missing (living people)